Walter Fuller may refer to:

 Walter Fuller (editor) (1881–1927), poet, anti-war activist and editor
 Walter Fuller (musician) (1910–2003), jazz trumpeter and vocalist
 Gil Fuller (1920–1994) composer